Mike Fink (also spelled Miche Phinck) (c. 1770/1780 – c. 1823), called "king of the keelboaters", was a semi-legendary brawler and river boatman who exemplified the tough and hard-drinking men who ran keelboats up and down the Ohio and Mississippi Rivers.

Historical figure

Mike Fink was born at Fort Pitt in present-day Pittsburgh, Pennsylvania, and served as an Indian scout in his teenage years. Even as a teenager, he was an unbeatable marksman, and he earned the name "Bangall" among militiamen at Fort Pitt. When the Indian wars of the region ended, in the mid 1790s, Fink, like many other scouts, spurned a sedentary life as a farmer. Instead, he drifted into the transport business on the Ohio and Mississippiand quickly picked up a new nickname: "the snapping turtle".

When he began his career in navigation, he became notorious, both for his practical jokes, and for his willingness to fight anyone who was not amused.  His 180-pound frame stretched 6'3" in height, and the muscles required to force a keelboat upstream would have made him a formidable opponent to most. It was said that he could drink a gallon of whisky and still shoot the tail off a pig at 90 paces; and Fink, himself, proclaimed, on every possible occasion, that he could "out-run, out-hop, out-jump, throw-down, drag out, and lick any man in the country".

He and his friends were supposed to have amused themselves by shooting cups of whiskey from each other's heads.  Other repeating episodes, of the Mike Fink legends, include a tale where he shoots the scalp lock from the head of an Indian, and a story in which he shoots the protruding heel from the foot of an African-American slave with surgical precision. Hauled into court, he pointed out to a judge that his victim would never have been able to wear a fashionable boot if a good Samaritan, namely himself, had not intervened on the man's behalf.

Besides imagined feats making part of the legend of Mike Fink, it may have also been woven from two (or more) men with the same name.  Mike Fink signed up as one of Ashley's Hundred and formed a part of the band that built Fort Henry.  If this man had been the one born at Fort Pitt about 1770, he would have been, at least, 50 years old.  Such an advanced age, in that group of teenage boys, would have been remarked on. Hugh Glass, the mountain man who survived a grizzly bear mauling, was called "Old Hugh", for being in his early 40s.  No journal mentions Fink's advanced age, so it may have been a younger Mike Fink who joined the expedition of the Ashley Rocky Mountain Fur Company.

Davy Crockett is supposed to have described him as "half horse and half alligator." Fink wore a red feather in his cap, to signal his defeat of every strong man, up and down the river.

Henry Howe's Historical Collections of Ohio contained an 1806 (1886?) interview with Capt. John Fink, who said that Mike Fink was a relative.

When I was a lad," John told me, "about ten years of age, our family lived four miles up river from Wheeling, on the river. Mike laid up (landed) his boat near us, though he generally had two boats. This was his last trip, and he went away to the far West; the country here was getting too civilized, and he was disgusted with progress. This was about 1815.

In the management of his business Mike Fink was a rigid disciplinarian; woe to the man who shirked his responsibilities or did not carry his own weightliterally. He always had his woman along with him, and would allow no other man to speak with her. She was sometimes a subject for his wonderful skill in marksmanship with the rifle. He would have her hold on the top of her head a tin cup filled with whiskey, which he would put a bullet through. Another of his feats was to have her hold it between her knees, as in a vise, and then shoot.

According to the Miami Valley Historical Society, (specifically, Miami Valley Vignettes by George C. Crout), until 1815, when he moved west, Mike Fink did not operate keel boats on the Ohio but on the Great Miami River from the Ohio River to Fort Loramie, where portage was made to the Maumee River in order to continue going on up to Lake Erie.

If it was indeed he who joined Ashley's Hundred, Fink died in the Rocky Mountains in 1823, during the course of Ashley's expedition. Some say it was a drunken argument over what he always called a chère amiea romantic interest. Timothy Field, in 1829, said that in a drunken stupor, when aiming at a mug of beer from the head of his longtime friend, a companion named Carpenter, he shot low; shortly thereafter, his other longtime friend, Talbot, retaliated by killing Fink, using Carpenter's pistol.

In popular culture

The recorded exploits of Mike Fink featured mostly in American broadside ballads, dime novels, and other subliterary texts from before the Civil War era. The first known reference to the character is in an 1821 farce, The Pedlar by Alphonso Wetmore. Here, Fink appears as the stereotypical bully and braggart. He appears frequently in stories involving the Davy Crockett cycle, but Fink lacked Crockett's more admirable traits.

Over time, the unlikeable features of the character came even more to the forefront, and Fink was portrayed increasingly as a bully who got his comeuppance. After the Civil War, the character began to be neglected; the mood of Americans disinclined them to admire a bumptious and violent folk hero. In the early 20th century, there was an attempt to revive his popularity, spearheaded by Colonel Henry Shoemaker, a Pennsylvania folklorist, who collected Mike Fink tales, and saw the character as a local equivalent to Crockett, but Shoemaker's attempt at reviving the character sputtered.

In 1955, Mike Fink (as portrayed by character actor Jeff York) appeared in two episodes of the Davy Crockett miniseries of ABC's Disneyland opposite the popular Davy Crockett (portrayed by Fess Parker). These episodes were later compiled into a feature film entitled Davy Crockett and the River Pirates, released in 1956. Elements of the Fink legend were present in Walt Disney's rendition, but the character was played mostly for laughs as a foil for the infallible Crockett. Keel boats bearing Fink's name, Mike Fink Keel Boats, operated at Disneyland and Magic Kingdom's Liberty Square until they were quietly retired in the late 1990s, when one unexpectedly capsized and dumped guests and cast members into the river.

In 1958, Zachary Ball, known as an author who wrote adventure stories for boys, wrote a fictional account of the early life of Mike Fink entitled Young Mike Fink. Similar to Disney's portrayal of Fink, Ball's title character is good natured and helpful despite his sometimes hooligan and contrary temperament.

Mike Fink also appears in Eudora Welty's parodic fairy-tale The Robber Bridegroom.

In Orson Scott Card's The Tales of Alvin Maker, an alternate version of Mike Fink appears in every novel after the first. Unlike other significant characters, he has no magical knack, but, prior to meeting Alvin, he was made invincible by means of a tattoo given to him at birth (similar to Achilles). In the books, his invulnerability is what made him a bully; having no conception of pain, he could not appreciate the effects of his actions (Prentice Alvin). In Alvin Journeyman, he resurfaces, grateful to Alvin for both sparing his life and teaching him the folly of his previous life of violence.

Mike Fink is played by Forrest Tucker in the 1977 made for TV film The Incredible Rocky Mountain Race, in which Fink is pitted in a rivalry against Mississippi riverboater and future author Mark Twain in a cross-country scavenger hunt, although the real-life Twain was born twelve years after Fink's death. Much of the story and its humor is culled from Twain's various works.

In 1998, children's author, Steven Kellogg, wrote a book entitled Mike Fink: A Tall Tale. As in his other books, Kellogg's account of Fink incorporates tall tales with vivid illustrations – highlighting the main character's positive side.

Mike Fink is a prime character in the 2007 young-adult historical novel Mississippi Jack by Louis A. Meyer. In it, Fink is outwitted by the main character of the book series. He is portrayed as a large, hairy, loud man who constantly boasts about his many feats in life. He is first met while traveling down the Allegheny River and is later seen in Pittsburgh, where he is put in jail for fighting.

On the Ohio River in Cincinnati, OH and Covington, KY, a riverboat restaurant called Mike Fink's was a popular attraction for over 40 years. It specialized in fresh seafood and had a large raw bar in the center of the boat. It closed in 2008 and was moved in 2014 to Newport, KY, with the hope it would be renovated and reopened.  However, the boat ended up as a shop barge in 2019.

Mike Fink also appear in Fate/Grand Order as an enemy.

There are some tall tales that mention he had a daughter named Sal Fink, who was said to be equally daring and known for her holler.

See also
 Tall tales
 Keelboats

References

External links 

Mike Fink Tales and Stories

1770 births
1823 deaths
American folklore
American sailors
Folklore of the Southern United States
Mississippi River
Mountain men
People from Pittsburgh
People of the American Old West
Tall tales